Puno is a department and region in southeastern Peru. It is the fifth largest department in Peru, after Cuzco, Madre de Dios, Ucayali, and Loreto. It is bordered by Bolivia on the east, the departments of Madre de Dios on the north, Cusco and Arequipa on the west, Moquegua on the southwest, and Tacna on the south. Its capital is the city of Puno, which is located on Lake Titicaca in the geographical region known as the Altiplano or high sierra.

Puno was the territory of the Tiahuanacos (800 A.D. – 1200 A.D.), who were the highest cultural expression of the Aymara people who established themselves in what is today Peru and Bolivia. The Incas took over these lands in the fifteenth century, and the Spanish, attracted by the mining industry developed there, left an important Colonial legacy throughout the entire area.

Geography

The department of Puno is located in the Collao Plateau. The western part of Lake Titicaca, which is the world's highest navigable lake, is located in the department. The Andean mountains make up 70% of the region's territory, and the rest is covered by the Amazon rainforest.

The lake contains numerous islands whose inhabitants continue to live as their ancestors have in custom and tradition. The Uros an example of this; this people group lives on "floating islands" that they have artificially made entirely of totora reeds, and they navigate in their traditional boats also made out of totora reeds. Taquile, Suasi, and Amantaní are known for their kindness of their residents, their ancestral skill in weaving, their pre-Columbian constructions, and lovely countryside. The Titicaca National Reserve (36,180 hectares) protects extensive stretches of totora reeds and various species of plants and animals.

The climate is cold and dry, with a four-month rain season. On the other hand, the climate of the rainforest is warm. The water resources are taken from the Lake Titicaca, 50 lagoons and more than 300 rivers. There is also an important potential in underground waters.

Political division
The region is divided into 13 provinces (provincias, singular: provincia), which are composed of 107 districts (distritos, singular: distrito). The provinces, with their capitals in parentheses, are:

 Azángaro (Azángaro)
 Carabaya (Macusani)
 Chucuito (Juli)
 El Collao (Ilave)
 Huancané (Huancané)
 Lampa (Lampa)
 Melgar (Ayaviri)
 Moho (Moho)
 Puno (Puno)
 San Antonio de Putina (Putina)
 Sandia (Sandia)
 San Román (Juliaca)
 Yunguyo (Yunguyo)

History

In ancient times, the Collao plateau was inhabited by Aymara groups (Collas or Qolla, Zapanas, Kallahuayos and Lupacas). The Quechuas came later.

According to chronicler Inca Garcilaso de la Vega, these ancient times coincide with the legend of Manco Cápac and Mama Ocllo, who emerged from the waters of  Lake Titicaca to found the Inca Empire.

The Aymara culture, also known as Putina, was the most important and influential pre-Hispanic culture in the region.

During the Viceroyship, Puno was the obliged route for travelers going to Potosí, Bolivia. In 1668, viceroy Conde de Lemos established San Juan Bautista de Puno as the capital of the province of Paucarcolla. Later, it was called San Carlos de Puno, in honor of the ruling king, Charles II of Spain.

In 1870, the railway route Arequipa-Puno was installed and navigation in Lake Titicaca started.

In 2007, a meteorite landed in the region, triggering a widespread illness amongst the locals. The exact cause of the illness is unknown, but is speculated to be a result of arsenic or other toxic chemicals that may have been released by the heat of impact.

Language and ethnicity
Indigenous people are the majority in the Puno region. , 41.4% of Puno's inhabitants speak Quechua, 30.39% speak Aymara; 0.05% speak Ashaninka; and 0.03% speak another indigenous language. Monolingual Spanish speakers make up 28.1% of the population.

According to the 2007 Peru Census, the language learnt first by most of the residents was Quechua (38.01%) followed by Spanish (34.81%) and Aymara (26.93%). The Quechua variety spoken in Puno is Cusco–Collao Quechua. The following table shows the results concerning the language learnt first in the Puno Region by province:

Tourism

Tourism is currently expanding in the Puno Region, with several tour operators and hotels ranging from low budget hostels to high-end hotels.

References 

Regions of Peru